Ivanchug is a rural locality (a selo) and the administrative center of Ivanchugsky Selsoviet, Kamyzyaksky District, Astrakhan Oblast, Russia. The population was 1,423 as of 2010. There are 14 streets.

Geography 
Ivanchug is located on the Gandurino River, 16 km southwest of Kamyzyak (the district's administrative centre) by road. Uvary is the nearest rural locality.

References 

Rural localities in Kamyzyaksky District